The 2021 Oceania Rugby Cup for national rugby union teams in the Oceania region was set to be held in Papua New Guinea in June 2021. 

The event was cancelled on 30 April 2021 as a result of the coronavirus pandemic in Papua New Guinea. Since the outcome would have determined which side would move on to the third round of Oceania qualification for the 2023 Rugby World Cup, Cook Islands was chosen to progress due to their higher position in the World Rugby Rankings at the time.

Standings

Points breakdown:4 points for a win2 points for a draw

See also
 Oceania Rugby Cup

References

2021
Rugby union competitions in Oceania for national teams
2021 rugby union tournaments for national teams
2021 in Oceanian rugby union
2021 in Papua New Guinean sport
2021 in Solomon Islands sport
International rugby union competitions hosted by Papua New Guinea
Oceania Rugby Cup
Oceania Rugby Cup